Dovid Shmidel (also spelled Dovid Schmidel, Polish: Szmiedl; born 1934) of Bnei Brak is a rabbi and the Chairman of Asra Kadisha (the Committee for the Preservation of Gravesites). He was involved in struggles against excavations at various locations including at the Tomb of Maimonides in Tiberias in 1956 and at Israel's Highway 6; as well as at the disputed tomb of Antigonus II Mattathias in East Jerusalem. For an entire year, Shmidel was occupied with preserving the old Jewish cemetery in Egypt.

Shmidel heads a kolel in Komemiyut for tens of married men who live in Jerusalem, Beit Shemesh, and other places, but they stay all week at the kolel and only go home for Shabbat. Shmidel delivers shiurim once or twice a week.

He was born in Vienna on April 2, 1934. In 1939, at age 5, he moved with his family to Mandatory Palestine. He studied at the Slabodka yeshiva and later at Kollel Chazon Ish in Bnei Brak under Rabbi Gedaliah Nadel. He also studied under Rabbi Moshe Shmuel Shapiro.

Shmidel frequently consulted Rabbis Avrohom Yeshaya Karelitz and Yitzchok Zev Soloveitchik. After the death of Rabbi Soloveitchik, Shmidel's mentor was Rabbi Soloveitchik's son, Rabbi Berel Soloveitchik. Shmidel met Rabbi Joel Teitelbaum twice, once in 1965 and once two weeks before Teitelbaum's death in 1979.

Shmidel is married and has seven daughters and a son.

References 

1934 births
Leaders of organizations
Living people
People from Bnei Brak
Rabbis from Vienna
Rabbis in Bnei Brak